Cashmere is a suburb in the Moreton Bay Region, Queensland, Australia.

Geography 
Cashmere is on the north-western outskirts of the Brisbane metropolitan area.

Cashmere is near the foothills of the D'Aguilar Range surrounded by dense forest. Cashmere is bounded to the north by Lake Samsonvale and is located west of Warner.

History 
The origin of the suburb name is from an early property owner by the name of James Cash.

The median age of the Cashmere population was 35 years, 2 years below the national median of 37. 77.3% of people living in Cashmere were born in Australia. The other top responses for country of birth were England 7.2%, New Zealand 3.6%, South Africa 3.1%, Scotland 0.7%, Germany 0.6%. 94.2% of people spoke only English at home; the next most common languages were 1% Afrikaans, 0.4% German, 0.4% Italian, 0.3% Hindi, 0.2% French.

References

External links
 

Suburbs of Moreton Bay Region